Çatalca is a village in the Şemdinli District in Hakkâri Province in Turkey. The village is populated by Kurds of the Humaru tribe and had a population of 993 in 2022.

Çatalca has the five hamlets of Erdemli, Güvenli, Mirava, Niksa and Soğuksu attached to it. Mirava and Niksa are unpopulated.

Population 
Population history of the village from 2000 to 2022:

References 

Villages in Şemdinli District
Kurdish settlements in Hakkâri Province